On 22 June 1883, the Geographical Society of Australasia started at a meeting in Sydney, New South Wales, Australia. A branch was formed in Victoria in the same year. In July 1885, both the Queensland and the South Australian branches started.

In July 1886 the society became the Royal Geographical Society of Australasia.  The New South Wales branch's new constitution in 1886 widened its scope to encourage interest in scientific, commercial, educational and historical aspects of geography. The Society sponsored several important expeditions, notably the New Guinea Exploration Expedition in 1885, whose members included zoologist Wilhelm Haacke, erstwhile director of the South Australian Museum.

The Victorian branch amalgamated with the Victorian Historical Society, while the New South Wales branch had ceased to function by the early 1920s. The South Australian and Queensland branches continue as the Royal Geographical Society of South Australia and Royal Geographical Society of Queensland respectively .

South Australia
The South Australian branch was formed on 10 July 1885. In 1905 they acquired the York Gate Library, following the death of Stephen William Silver a prosperous London merchant who had branched out into publishing information for colonial settlers alongside clothes, furniture and other equipment for use in the British colonies.

Members
The founding members were:
 His Honor the Chief Justice S. J. Way
 Sir Henry Ayers, KCMG. (President of the Legislative Council)
 Sir Samuel Davenport
 Sir Thomas Elder
 Hons. George W. Cotton
 David Murray
 Henry Scott
 Robert Alfred Tarlton, M.L.C.
 Bishop Kennion, D.D.
 Archdeacon Farr, M.A., LLD, Rev. F. Williams, M.A.
 Peter Egerton-Warburton
 F. E. H. W. Krichauff, M.P.
 Edwin Thomas Smith, M.P.
 William Bundey (Mayor of Adelaide)
 J. A. Hartley, B.A., B.Sc. (lnspector-General of Schools)
 James W. Jones (Conservator of Water)
 J. Langdon Bonython
 J. F. Conigrave
 T. Evans Jr.
 William Everard
 Tom Gill
 C. Hope Harris
 E. Holthouse
 A. T. Magarey
 C. M. McKillop F.R.G.S.
 C. J. Sanders
 Samuel Tomkinson
 W. H. Tietkens, F.R.G.S.
 W. B. Wilkinson
 Thomas Worsnop
 F. S. Wallis.

Later prominent members were:
 Simpson Newland (president 1895–1900 and 1920–1922)
 A. M. Simpson
 A. A. Simpson (president 1925–1930)
 John Lewis (president 1913–1920)
 A. W. Piper KC (president 1910–1913)
 Clive M. Hambidge (president 1944–1947).
 T. S. Reed (secretary 1903–1914)
 F. L. Parker (secretary 1922–1932; president 1934–1936)
 A. A. Lendon MD.

See also
 List of Australian organisations with royal patronage
 Tietkens expedition of 1889

References

External links
Royal Geographical Society of Queensland website
Royal Geographical Society of South Australia website
Royal Geographical Society of South Australia blog site

Geography
Geography
Geography
Geography
Geography
Geographic societies